Sociedad Deportiva Solares-Medio Cudeyo  is a football team based in Solares, Medio Cudeyo in the autonomous community of Cantabria. Founded in 1968, the team plays in 3 RFEF. The club plays its home games at La Estación, which has artificial turf, capacity of 1,500 spectators and a stadium bar.

History
The club was founded in 1968 with the name of Solares Sociedad Deportiva. In 2014, after the takeover of the Municipal Football School of Medio Cudeyo, the club took the denomination of Sociedad Deportiva Solares-Medio Cudeyo. In the 2016-17 season the club won Preferente Cantabria and promoted to the Tercera División.

Season to season

10 seasons in Tercera División

References

External links
Official website
Futbolme.com profile

Football clubs in Cantabria
Association football clubs established in 1968
Divisiones Regionales de Fútbol clubs
1968 establishments in Spain